Tribute Money may refer to:

The Tribute Money (Masaccio), a fresco in the Brancacci Chapel
The Tribute Money (Rubens), a 1612–14 painting by Peter Paul Rubens
The Tribute Money (Titian), a 1516 painting
The Tribute Money, either of two paintings by Giuseppe Bazzani
The Tribute Money, an 1817 painting by George Hayter
The Tribute Money, a painting by Ludovico Mazzolino
The Tribute Money, a 1629 etching by Rembrandt
Tribute Money, a painting by Alexander Maximilian Seitz

See also
Christ and the Tribute Money, a painting by Anton von Werner
Jesus and the Tribute money, a painting by Giovanni Serodine
St Peter finding the Tribute Money, a 1617–18 painting by Peter Paul Rubens
St. Peter Finding the Tribute Money, a ca. 1623 painting by Jacob Jordaens
Tribute (disambiguation)
Tribute penny